Stephen Gilson is an American theorist and policy analyst who is best known for his work in disability, diversity, and health policy through the lens of legitimacy theory and disjuncture theory.  Co-authored with Elizabeth DePoy, Gilson developed Explanatory Legitimacy Theory.  Through that lens, Gilson analyzes how population group membership is assigned, is based on political purpose, and is met with formal responses that serve both intentionally and unintentionally to perpetuate segregation, economic status quo, and inter-group tension.  Additionally, co-authored with DePoy, Gilson developed Disjuncture Theory.  This theory explains disability as an interactive “ill-fit” between bodies (broadly defined) and environments (broadly defined).

Gilson has applied legitimacy theory and disjuncture theory to the analysis and enactment of health policy and practices related to access and to illness prevention.  Along with DePoy, Gilson has implemented his vision of socially just policy based on universal access principles through the creation of a web portal that renders existing illness prevention information accessible to individuals across diversity category boundaries.

Gilson has received invitations to keynote at national and international conferences on disability studies and distinguished lectures at University of Illinois at Chicago, University of Michigan at Ann Arbor, Smith College, NYU, University of North Carolina, Ono Academic College, Research Institute for Health and Medical Professions, and others.

Biography 
Gilson was born in 1950 in Long Beach, California, to a family of three—an older brother, Michael, and his mother and father, Janet and Arnold Gilson.  Later, in 1955, a younger sister, Nancy, would join them.  He spent years as an artist before earning a BA in 1973, and PhD in 1991 from the University of Nebraska Medical Center.

Recent activities
In Rethinking Disability, first published in 2004, and Disability as Disjuncture, currently in press, Gilson with co-author Elizabeth DePoy, takes on the essentialist nature of current diversity categories with a particular focus on disability, laying bare the value foundation and political and economic purpose of “disability category” assignment and social, professional and community response.  His subsequent works, also co-authored with DePoy, include The Human Experience, published in 2007, Evaluation Practice (2008), Studying Disability (2010), and selected essays and papers.  This scholarship applies legitimacy and disjuncture theories to understanding theories of human description and explanation and their purposive, political use in diverse “helping professional” worlds.

Recently, Gilson, with co-author DePoy, applies design theory and practice to the analysis of diversity categories, their membership and their maintenance.  In his non-profit work, he has applied this theory to the development of inexpensive, aesthetically designed prototypes, strategies, and products that enhance the ability of all people to engage in healthy behaviors.  In the spring 2010, Gilson received funding to study campus architectures as symbols of campus cultural policy.  He has also applied design and branding to the development of robotics for non-stigmatized augmentation of human function.

Gilson is currently professor and co-coordinator of Interdisciplinary Disability Studies at the University of Maine and a principal of ASTOS Innovations, a non-profit corporation devoted to improving equality of access to community resources in local, national, and global environments.  ASTOS Innovations designs and develops model access solutions.  Gilson also holds an appointment as Senior Research Fellow. Ono Academic College's Research Institute for Health and Medical Professions, Kiryat Ono, Israel.

Awards
Guest Research Scientist. National Institute on Alcohol Abuse and Alcoholism. Bethesda, MD. 1988-1991.
Fellow. National Institute on Drug Abuse. Intramural Research Training Award. Addiction Research Center - Neuroimaging and Drug Action Section. Baltimore, MD. National Institutes of Health. Baltimore and Bethesda, MD, 1991-1993.
Visiting Researcher Appointment, National Institute on Drug Abuse. Addiction Research Center - Neuroimaging and Drug Action Section. Baltimore, MD. Summer. National Institutes of Health. Baltimore, MD, 1995.
CSWE Commission on the Role and Status of Women “Feminist Scholarship Award for 2000.” E. P. Cramer, S. F. Gilson, and E. DePoy – “Experiences of Abuse and Service Needs of Abused Women with Disabilities”.
Allan Meyers Award for Scholarship in Disability, American Public Health Association, September, 2005.
Faculty Fellowship Summer Institute in Israel, Society for Peace in the Middle East, Summer, 2008. Sponsored by Bar-Ilan University, Hebrew University of Jerusalem, Ben-Gurion University of the Negev, Tel Aviv University, University of Haifa, Technion – Israel Institute of Technology, Jewish National Fund, Media Watch International, Scholars for Peace in the Middle East.
2008 University Center for Excellence in Developmental Disabilities (AUCD), Multicultural Council Award for Leadership in Diversity.
2009 University of Maine, Department of Psychology, Stanley Sue Distinguished Lecture Series, Diversity Lecture - "Now guess who is coming to the diversity dinner: Disability and beyond bodies and backgrounds".
2009 Society for Disability Studies (SDS), Senior Scholar Award.

Selected works 
Selected Articles and Essays
 Gilson, S. F. & DePoy, E., (2005/2006). "Reinventing atypical bodies in art, literature and technology". International Journal of Technology, Knowledge and Society. 3, 7.
 Gilson, S. F. & DePoy, E. (2007). "Geographic analysis for the social sciences". The International Journal of Interdisciplinary Social Sciences, 1.
 Gilson, S. F. & DePoy, E. (2007). "Da Vinci’s Ill Fated Design Legacy: Homogenization and Standardization". International Journal of the Humanities, 57.
 Gilson, S. F. (2007). Underground advocacy: emergence of the consumer voice.  In Fauri D.;  E. F. Netting, S. P. Wernet (Eds.). Cases in Macro Social Work Practice. (3rd ed.) (pp. 45–60). Boston: Allyn & Bacon.
 Gilson, S. F. (2007). "Changing person-environment configurations: Importance of gaining an understanding of the biological system". In Hutchison E. D. (Ed.), Human Behavior in the Social Environment (3rd ed.) (pp. 79–115). Thousand Oaks, CA: Pine Forge.
 Gilson, S. F. & DePoy, E. (2008). "Explanatory legitimacy: A model for disability policy development and analysis". In K. M. Sowers (Series Ed.) I. Colby (Vol. Ed.), Comprehensive Handbook of Social Work and Social Welfare: Vol 4. Social policy and policy practice (pp. 203–217). Hoboken, NJ: John Wiley & Sons.
 Gilson, S. F. & DePoy, E. (2008). "Designer Diversity: Constructing Bodies and Backgrounds through Contemporary Design Theory". International Journal of the Humanities, 6(4), 177–188.
 DePoy, E. & Gilson S. F. (2008). "Healing the disjuncture: Social work disability practice".  In K. M. Sowers & C. N. Dulmus (Series Eds.) & B. W. White (Vol. Ed.), Comprehensive Handbook of Social Work and Social Welfare: Vols. 1. The Profession of Social Work (pp. 267–282), and 4. Social policy and policy practice (pp. 203–217). Hoboken, NJ: John Wiley & Sons.
 DePoy, E. & Gilson, S. F. (in press) "Social work practice with disability: Moving from the perpetuation of a client category to human rights and social justice". Journal of Social Work Values and Ethics, 5(3).
 DePoy, E. & Gilson, S. F. (2008). "Disability Studies: Origins, Current Conflict, and Resolution". The Review of Disability Studies: An International Journal 4(4), 33–42.
 DePoy, E. & Gilson, S. F. (2008). "Designing University Techscapes: An Inter-Organizational Technology Collaboration to Advance Equality of Participation in University Organizations". In J. Salmons & L. Wilson (Eds.), A Handbook of Research on Electronic Collaboration and Organizational Synergy. (pp. 223–237). Hershey, PA: IGI Global.
 DePoy, E. & Gilson, S. F. (2009). "Designer diversity: Moving beyond categorical branding". The Journal of Comparative Social Welfare. 25, 59–70.
 Gilson S. F. & DePoy, E. (2009) "Policy legitimacy: a model for disability policy analysis and change". Review of Disability Studies: An International Journal.
 DePoy, E. & Gilson, S. F. (in press). "Disability by Design". The Review of Disability Studies: An International Journal.

Recent Books
 DePoy, E. & Gilson S. (2003). Evaluation Practice. New York, NY, Taylor & Francis.
 DePoy, E. & Gilson S. F. (2004). Rethinking Disability: Principles for Professional and Social Change. Pacific Grove, CA: Brooks-Cole.
 DePoy, E. & Gilson S. (2007). The Human Experience: Description, Explanation, and Judgment. Lanham, MD: Rowman & Littlefield.
 DePoy, E. & Gilson S. (2007). Evaluation Practice: How to Do Good Evaluation Research in Work Settings. New York, NY: Routledge.
 DePoy, E. & Gilson, S. F. (in press). Studying Disability. Thousand Oaks, CA: SAGE Publications.

References

External links

 
 
 

University of Maine faculty
Disability studies academics
Living people
1950 births